Nationality words link to articles with information on the nation's poetry or literature (for instance, Irish or France).

Events

Works published

Births
Death years link to the corresponding "[year] in poetry" article. There are conflicting or unreliable sources for the birth years of many people born in this period; where sources conflict, the poet is listed again and the conflict is noted:

1021:
 Solomon ibn Gabirol (died 1058), Hebrew poet in Al-Andalus
 Wang Anshi (died 1086), Song poet

Deaths
Birth years link to the corresponding "[year] in poetry" article:

1020:
Ferdowsi (born c. 940), Persian poet and writer

See also

 Poetry
 11th century in poetry
 11th century in literature
 List of years in poetry

Other events:
 Other events of the 12th century
 Other events of the 13th century

11th century:
 11th century in poetry
 11th century in literature

Notes

11th-century poetry
Poetry